Zhou Xuan (born Su Pu; August 1, 1920  – September 22, 1957), also romanized as Chow Hsuan, was an iconic Chinese singer and film actress. By the 1940s, she had become one of China's Seven Great Singing Stars. She was the best known of the seven, nicknamed the "Golden Voice", and had a concurrent movie career until 1954.  She recorded more than 200 songs and appeared in over 40 films in her career.

Early life
Zhou was born Su Pu, but was separated from her natural parents at a young age and raised by adoptive parents. She spent her entire life searching for her biological parents but her parentage was never established until after her death.

According to later family research, a relative who was an opium addict took her at the age of 3 to another city and sold her to a family named Wang, who named her Wang Xiaohong. She was later adopted by a family named Zhou, changing her name to Zhou Xiaohong.

At the age of 13, she took Zhou Xuan as her stage name, 'Xuan' meaning beautiful jade in Chinese.

Career

In 1932, Zhou began acting as a member of Li Jinhui's Bright Moon Song and Dance Troupe. When she was 12, she won second prize in a singing contest in Shanghai and was given the nickname "Golden Voice" for her effortless high-pitched melodies.

Zhou began her film career in 1935, and she achieved stardom in 1937 when director Yuan Muzhi cast her as one of the leads as a singing girl in Street Angel.  Zhou rapidly became the most famous and marketable popular singer in the gramophone era up to her death, singing many famous tunes from her own movies.

Between 1946 and 1950, she often went to Hong Kong to make films such as "All-Consuming Love", "Hua wai liu ying", Sorrows of the Forbidden City, and "Rainbow Song".  After introducing "Shanghai Nights" in 1949, Zhou returned to Shanghai. She spent the next few years in and out of mental institutions owing to frequent breakdowns. Through the years, Zhou led a complicated and unhappy life marked by her failed marriages, illegitimate children, and suicide attempts. Zhou's first husband was the composer Yan Hua (1912–1992), who wrote and sometimes also performed songs with her.

Despite having made a total of 43 movies, her most well-known performance remained the 1937 film, Street Angel. This contained two theme songs: "Four Seasons Song" and "The Wandering Songstress", which enjoyed long-lasting popularity. Other well-known songs by Zhou Xuan include "When Will You Return?", "Shanghai Nights" (title song from the film of the same name), "Yellow Leaves Dancing in the Autumn Wind", "Eternal Smile", "Hundred Flower Song", "Advice", "Where Can the Soul Mate be Found", and "Picking Betel Nuts".

Death
In 1957 she died in Shanghai in a mental asylum at the age of 37.  A possible cause of death may be encephalitis following a nervous breakdown. Zhou's diary concluded that she suffered from cerebritis.

Zhou Xuan was survived by two sons, Zhou Min and Zhou Wei, born of different fathers.  Zhou Min was widely believed to be the son of the businessman Zhu Huaide, who left for Shanghai in 1950 after Zhou Xuan entrusted him with her savings and never returned; Zhou Min was born in that same year. According to her elder son Zhou Min's biography, her younger son, Zhou Wei, was the son of the art designer Tang Di, while the biological father of Zhou Min himself was not revealed.

Zhou Wei currently lives in Toronto performing at times in the TTC subways and participating in various musical projects, including teaching. He is a flautist. He has two daughters, both musicians. The elder of the two, Zhou Xiaoxuan, is a classical pianist trained at Concordia University and now living in Beijing. The youngest, Amanda Zhou, is taking a similar path as an actress and has already worked on a few shows and films.

Cultural legacy

To this day, Zhou Xuan's songs still remain a staple in many Golden Oldies collections in Mandarin popular music.

There have been two biographies written by Zhou Xuan's surviving family members. The book My Mother Zhou Xuan was written by Zhou Wei and his wife Chang Jing; while a later book, Zhou Xuan Diary, was written by Zhou Min.

Television
An adaptation of the life of Zhou Xuan was produced in TVB's Song Bird (1989), starring Adia Chan as Zhou Xuan and Leon Lai as her lover. In this series, Xuan's songs were re-written in Cantonese and sung by Chan. She sang duets with Lai in the program while under Crown Records. Deric Wan replaced Lai's vocals on the soundtrack album.

Another adaptation, based on Zhou Wei's biography, is the Chinese serial titled Zhou Xuan, starring Cecilia Cheung. This version of the story was accused by Zhou Wei as a false representation of Zhou Xuan and damaging to the reputation of the Zhou family.

Filmography
  (1935)
 Street Angel (1937)
  (1940)
  (1940)
 Dream of the Red Chamber (1944)
 Night Inn (1947)
 An All-Consuming Love (1947)
 Sorrows of the Forbidden City (1948)
 Orioles Banished from the Flowers (1948)
 Song of a Songstress (1948)
 Waste Not Our Youth , 1949)
  (1950)

See also
 C-pop, an overview of Chinese popular music
 Mandopop, the Mandarin-language subgenre 
 Cantopop, for popular music performed in Cantonese
 Seven Great Singing Stars

References

External links

 Chinese Film Classics: Zhou Xuan
 Chinese Film Classics online course, Module 7: Street Angels (1937) - full film with English subtitles, and two video lectures about the film
 
 
 Zhou Xuan at the Chinese Movie Database
 

1920 births
1957 deaths
Actresses from Changzhou
Mandarin-language singers
Musicians from Changzhou
20th-century Chinese actresses
Chinese adoptees
Victims of human rights abuses
Singers from Jiangsu
Political abuses of psychiatry
Chinese film actresses
Burials in Shanghai
20th-century Chinese women singers
Chinese emigrants to Hong Kong
Pathé Records (China) artists